Konrad Ott (born May 20, 1959) is a German philosopher with a special interest in discourse ethics and environmental ethics.

Biography 
Konrad Ott was born 1959 in Bergkamen, Germany. From 1981 to 1986, he studied philosophy, history and German philology at the Johann Wolfgang Goethe-Universität Frankfurt am Main. He is regarded as a representative of the 'Third Generation' of the Frankfurt School.

Ott is currently Professor for Philosophy and Ethics of the Environment at Kiel University. From 2000 to 2008 he was a member of the German Advisory Council on the Environment. From 1997 to 2012 Ott was professor for environmental ethics at the University of Greifswald. Ott is also known as a critic of mass migration to Europe. Regarding migration from Africa via the Mediterranean, Ott postulated in 2018 that "this route must be dried out"; the merit of Italy's Home Office Secretary Matteo Salvini should be acknowledged "at least [...] to have made this route less attractive".

Bibliography 
In German:
 Ökologie und Ethik: Ein Versuch praktischer Philosophie. Tübingen 1993
 Vom Begründen zum Handeln: Aufsätze zur angewandten Ethik. Tübingen 1996
 Ipso facto: Zur ethischen Begründung normativer Implikate wissenschaftlicher Praxis. Frankfurt am Main 1997
 Ethik in der Informatik. Tübingen 1999 (as co-editor)
 Spektrum der Umweltethik. Marburg 2000 (as co-editor)
 Moralbegründungen zur Einführung. Hamburg 2001; Zweite Auflage 2005
 Theorie und Praxis starker Nachhaltigkeit. Marburg 2004; Zweite Auflage 2008 (as co-author)
 Umweltethik zur Einführung. Hamburg 2010
 Zuwanderung und Moral. Stuttgart 2016
 Naturethik und biblische Schöpfungserzählung. Ein diskurstheoretischer und narrativ-hermeneutischer Brückenschlag. (Together with Christof Hardmeier.) Stuttgart 2015
 Umweltethik. In: Kirchhoff, Thomas (ed.): Online Encyclopedia Philosophy of Nature / Online Lexikon Naturphilosophie. Heidelberg 2020, https://doi.org/10.11588/oepn.2020.0.68742

In English:
 The Case for Strong Sustainability
 Building a 'theory of sustainable development': two salient conceptions within the German discourse (as co-author)
 On Substantiating the Conception of Strong Sustainability
Environmental Ethics. In: Kirchhoff, Thomas (ed.): Online Encyclopedia Philosophy of Nature / Online Lexikon Naturphilosophie. Heidelberg 2020, https://doi.org/10.11588/oepn.2020.0.71420

External links 
 Universität Greifswald - Institut für Botanik und Landschaftsökologie: Professur für Umweltethik Professorship for Environmental Ethics at the University of Greifswald, Germany
 International Masters Programme "Landscape Ecology and Nature Conservation"

References 

20th-century German philosophers
21st-century German philosophers
Continental philosophers
Environmental ethicists
Frankfurt School
Green thinkers
German humanists
Academic staff of the University of Greifswald
Living people
1959 births
German male writers